The Specialized library on Islam and Iran was established on 1995 in Qom, Iran. This library contains resources, especially in the field of History of Iran and History of Islam. The library is the first specialized history library in Iran and the largest specialized history library in the Middle East.

Historical background
The lack of resources in historical fields in the Qom Seminary and the urgent need in this field, led to the establishment of the Specialized library on Islam and Iran based on the two tendencies of Islam and Iran to strengthen and activate discussions and historical studies in October 1995 in Qom, Iran. The Specialized library on Islam and Iran has undergone alteration during the last 25 years including change the location of the library four times. Over the years, newly published historical works from several international exhibitions in Syria, Egypt and Morocco, Mecca, Medina and Jeddah, and Arab and non-Arab countries has added the library collection.

Affiliation
The Specialized library on Islam and Iran is affiliated with the office of Ali al-Sistani, which is supervised by Javad Shahrestani. Rasul Jafarian is in charge of managing the library.

Collection
The library was opened with about 4000 books, but now, there are over 224000 books and journals in the collection. Books and magazines in 9 languages (Persian, Arabic, English, French, German, Chinese, Hebrew, Hindi and Istanbul Turkish) are available in the library.

Classification
The type of classification is thematic in such a way that according to the needs of library users, historical periods and regions are geographically divided and form different themes. In addition, marginal topics are divided according to well-known scientific branches in the history course. So far, the books have been divided into 89 sub-topics including:

See also
 Mar'ashi Najafi Library
 National Library of Iran

References

External links
 Picture report: Twentieth anniversary of the Specialized library on Islam and Iran

Buildings and structures in Qom
Libraries in Iran
1995 establishments in Iran
Libraries established in 1995